The Eight Hundred Block of F Street NW refers to a collection of five commercial buildings in the Penn Quarter neighborhood of Washington, DC.   It currently houses the International Spy Museum and is across the street from the Smithsonian American Art Museum.  It also houses a branch of the Shake Shack.

Buildings

1892, Warder Building, S.E. corner of 9th and F Sts, designed by Washington architect Nicholas T. Haller, Richardsonian Romanesque style, this was a large elevator building intended for use as offices, apartments and stores.
1875, Le Droit Building, S.W. corner of 8th and F Sts, designed by James H. McGill, Italianate commercial style, intended exclusively for use as offices

References

External links

Commercial buildings on the National Register of Historic Places in Washington, D.C.
Italianate architecture in Washington, D.C.
Romanesque Revival architecture in Washington, D.C.
Commercial buildings completed in 1875